Bertie Smart (9 February 1891 – 1950) was an English footballer who played in the Football League for Crewe Alexandra. Smart guested for Stoke during World War I, playing once in 1918–19.

Career statistics
Source:

References

1891 births
1950 deaths
English footballers
Association football midfielders
English Football League players
Hednesford Town F.C. players
Wolverhampton Wanderers F.C. players
Cannock Town F.C. players
Stoke City F.C. wartime guest players